Dundrennan (Gaelic: Dun Droighnein) is a village Dumfries and Galloway, Scotland, about  east of Kirkcudbright. Its population is around 230. Dundrennan is located in the civil parish of Rerrick in the historic county of Kirkcudbrightshire. It is most notable for the ruins of Dundrennan Abbey, a 12th-century Cistercian monastery. The weapons testing establishment Dundrennan Range is also nearby.

From 2001 until 2015 the Wickerman music festival was held on the nearby farm of East Kirkcarswell.

Dundrennan is a Gaelic name meaning 'hill of thorns' from the words dùn 'fortified place, hill' and droigheann 'blackthorn, bramble'. It is recorded in c.1160 as Dundrainan.

Dundrennan Air Crash 
On 18 July 1944 at 12:15am, on a night training exercise from RAF Carlisle, Crosby-on-Eden, an RAF Beaufighter crashed into a house in the main street. Four members of the Hamilton family died along with the two airmen. 

Their names are.

James Hamilton aged 35 and his wife Georgina aged 33, their children Henry aged 10 and Agnes aged 8.

(Daughter Georgina aged 12 survived.)

Also the 2 airmen who died in the crash.

F/S Henry Wiles (RAFVR) Aged 21 from Aldershot,  buried at Aldershot Civilian Cemetery.

Sgt. Eric Young (RAFVR) Aged 21 from Huddersfield, plaque at Leeds Lawns Wood Crematorium.

Climate
Dundrennan has an oceanic climate (Köppen: Cfb).

See also
List of places in Dumfries and Galloway

References

External links

 https://www.iwm.org.uk/memorials/item/memorial/69406
Transcriptions and photographs of Gravestones in Dundrennan Abbey Grounds

Villages in Dumfries and Galloway